Verilus sordidus is a species of fish in the family Acropomatidae, the temperate ocean-basses or lanternbellies. It is native to the central western Atlantic Ocean.

This species grows to a length of  TL though most do not exceed . It can be distinguished from other fish in its genus by several characters, including villiform teeth on the upper jaw and conical teeth on the lower, with large canine teeth, and the number of spines and rays in its fins.

References

sordidus
Fish described in 1860